The Indianapolis Public Transportation Corporation, branded as IndyGo, is a public transit agency and municipal corporation of the City of Indianapolis in the U.S. state of Indiana. It operates fixed-route buses, bus rapid transit, microtransit, and paratransit services.

IndyGo has managed and operated the city's public bus transit system since 1975.

History 
IndyGo's history begins in 1953 when the city's streetcar system was converted to bus routes, most of which followed the same routes as used by the streetcars. The city of Indianapolis took over public transportation in 1975 and established the Indianapolis Public Transportation Corporation to administer bus services. The corporation originally operated buses under the name Metro Bus; the IndyGo name was adopted in 1996. Portions of the system were briefly privatized in the 1990s, but the move proved unpopular, and all operations were ultimately taken over by the city.

IndyGo has seen a near-constant trend of decreasing ridership since the 1970s and continues to explore options for revitalization. "Express" bus routes were used in the 1980s as an attempt to gain more middle-class riders from outlying areas, but the routes were largely discontinued by the early 2000s. In the fall of 2007, IndyGo resumed express routes, including one to Indianapolis International Airport.

Marion County Transit Plan

Indy Connect is a $1.2 billion plan to create a network of bus rapid transit lines, bikeways, and walkways. The first segment to be constructed is phase one of the Red Line, traveling  from Broad Ripple Avenue to the University of Indianapolis. Construction along the route began in June 2018 and the route opened on September 1, 2019.

In February 2020, the corporation announced it would be cancelling an order for five battery powered coaches for Route 39 along East 38th Street due to reliability issues with the BYD vehicles. IndyGo stated in a press release that the company had not met its contract which required the buses to cover  until recharging, nor did it provide a permanent enroute re-charging solution. The existing BYD vehicles have been moved to the Red Line, requiring a new $7.5 million contract for 13  Gillig diesel vehicles for Route 39.

In March 2020, the Indiana General Assembly debated a 10% public funding cut for IndyGo, after lawmakers claimed that the corporation was not engaging with 2015 legislation which required it seek up to 10% of their budget through private funding. Legislators have proposed withholding income tax money and preventing expansion routes until IndyGo meets its 10% funding goal. However, IndyGo CEO Inez Evans responded that the corporation had been unable to officially meet the target due to delays in establishing its foundation, which recently received $35,000 in private investment, and stated that public funding cuts could jeopardize its transit plans.

In April 2020, IndyGo announced it was postponing system-wide route changes as part of the Marion County Transit Plan implementation due to the COVID-19 pandemic. The changes would have switched the current hub-and-spoke system to a grid network that would allow for easier transfers across the city.

In August 2020, IndyGo initiated a "bus stop balancing" project to eliminate or consolidate 524 redundant or low-boarding bus stops and create 45 new bus stops. The effort is expected to expedite service on high-ridership routes.

Julia M. Carson Transit Center

The Julia M. Carson Transit Center at 201 E. Washington Street serves routes that transit downtown Indianapolis. Ground was broken for the $26.5 million facility in September 2014. A ribbon-cutting ceremony was held on June 21, 2016, with formal bus service beginning on June 26, 2016. Of IndyGo's 31 routes, 26 routes offer transfers at the station.

The transit center is named for Julia Carson, former U.S. Representative for Indiana's 7th congressional district (1997–2007). During her tenure in Congress, Carson helped secure federal funding for the $26.5 million transit center.

Routes 

IndyGo operates 31 fixed routes with some nearly 3,400 stops; bus frequency varies on the population density along the route. The system carries approximately 10.2 million passengers annually, traveling a total distance of about 9 million miles. While IndyGo provides bus service primarily in Indianapolis, certain IndyGo fixed routes extend south of the city into Johnson County.

Route List
2 East 34th Street
3 Michigan Street
4 Fort Harrison
5 East 25th Street
6 Harding
8 Washington
10 10th Street
11 East 16th
12 Minnesota
13 Raymond Street
14 Prospect
15 West 34th Street
16 Beech Grove
18 Broad Ripple
19 Castleton
21 East 21st Street
24 Mars Hill
25 West 16th
26 Keystone Crosstown
28 St Vincent/Women's Hospital
30 30th Street Crosstown
31 US 31
34 MLK/Michigan Road
37 Park 100
38 West 38th Street
39 East 38th Street
55 English
86 86th Street Crosstown
87 Eastside Circulator
90 Red Line
 
The Blue Line downtown circulator route was added in 2005 to attract passengers and saw considerable ridership. In late 2006, IndyGo complemented the Blue Line with the introduction of the Red Line, which runs between Indiana University – Purdue University Indianapolis (IUPUI) and downtown, with 15-minute frequency. The Blue Line's ridership declined as federal funding allotted for the route ran out, and the route was discontinued after December 31, 2007. The Red Line remained a free route until January 2009, at which time it became a regularly priced route. The Red Line was retired when the Downtown Transit Center opened, with IUPUI service being covered by Routes 3, 10, and 37, along with 15-minute frequency on Michigan St. and New York St.

In the fall of 2007, IndyGo introduced an express route operated by a contractor, using ADA-accessible MCI J4500 motor coaches. The route runs from downtown to the northern suburb of Fishers in Hamilton County, the most populous suburban county of Indianapolis. In March 2008, an additional express route to Carmel (also in Hamilton County) was launched, followed in March 2009 by express service to Greenwood, a southern suburb in Johnson County. These ICE Express Routes to Greenwood, Fishers, and Carmel were discontinued in 2010 after their federal grants expired.

Fleet 

The standard fleet of the Indianapolis Transit System consisted mostly of dark orange/silverside GM Old Look and GM New Look buses; the latter 40-foot coaches were air-conditioned. When it became the Indianapolis Public Transportation Corporation (adopting the Metro name) in 1975, the New Looks became the workhorse of the fleet, with the agency later adding AM General, GM RTS-II series, GMDD Canada New Look, and Orion I buses to the lineup as the New Looks wore out by the mid-1990s. These buses were painted white with brown-gold-brown stripes and the "Metro" name next to the exit door (except for the Canadian New Looks, which sported a bold black top around its windows) up until the change to the IndyGo branding in 1997.

By 1986, the buses had three greenish-blue stripes immediately below the windows and the word "Metro" near the front door. From 1997 to 2010, the Phantoms and Low-Floor Coaches were painted white with one large dark green stripe on the right front window and one light green stripe over the first window on the left side. The dome of the newer ones from 2003 and 2007 had it painted in the back. Since 2010, all buses have been painted white and have a sleek blue cap at the top of them, except for the hybrid models, which have green caps.

In service

Purchased new
2301–2324: 2003 Gillig 40-foot low floor buses. These buses are retired. 
2701–2710: 2007 Gillig 40-foot low floor buses. These buses are identical to the 2003 Gillig low floors except the rear end design. These buses are used for training.
1001–1011: 2010 Gillig 40-foot BRT buses. These buses feature significant design changes from previous Gillig models.
H1012–H1022: 2010 Gillig 40-foot BRT hybrid buses.
H1301–H1304: 2013 Gillig 40-foot BRT hybrid buses. These buses are identical to the previous Gillig BRT hybrids.
1401–1413: 2014 Gillig 40-foot BRT buses. These buses have destination signs that can change in brightness depending on the light of the surroundings (such as going through tunnels or running in the nighttime).
1501–1513: 2015 Gillig 40-foot BRT buses. These buses are identical to the 2014 Gillig BRTs with updated handicap seating, updated technology, and a different color scheme.
1601–1613: 2016 Gillig 40-foot BRT buses. These buses are identical to the 2015 buses, except they have updated seating like that of the electric buses and a brand new CAD system for the drivers. Previous models had LED "STOP" signs on the rear, but these were later swapped with regular tail lights.
1701–1716: 2017 Gillig 40-foot BRT Buses. These buses look exactly like the 2016 buses, except the seating goes back to the same style as the 2015 buses and before
1801–1817: 2018 Gillig 40-foot BRT buses. These buses have newer updated seating and newer flooring on the inside of the bus
1901–1916: 2019 Gillig 40-foot BRT buses. These buses are identical to the 2018 buses, but these have USB charging.
2072–2099: 2020 Gillig 40-foot BRT buses. These buses are also identical to the 2018 and 2019 buses, but the USB charging is under the seats just like Red Line Busses
H2101–H2124: 2021 Gillig 40-foot BRT Plus hybrid buses. These buses have a new paint scheme and a sleeker roof.

IndyGo also operates 40 Flexible Service vans and employs a contractor to operate an additional 40.

Purchased secondhand
9789–9799: 1997 New Flyer Industries D40LF 40-foot low floor buses. IndyGo purchased these from Santa Monica. These buses are retired.
0101-0118: 2000 New Flyer Industries D40LF 40-foot low floor buses. IndyGo purchased these buses early 2018 from COTA. These buses are retired. 
0130-0140: 2000 New Flyer Industries D40LF 40-foot low floor buses. IndyGo purchased these buses from COTA in 2013. These buses are retired. 
0001-0021: 40-foot low floor buses with ZEPS electric powertrains. IndyGo purchased these buses in 2015 for operation on shorter routes, as the buses can go 130 miles on a single charge. These buses are retired.
0201-0217: 2002 New Flyer Industries D60LF 60-foot articulated low floor buses. IndyGo purchased these buses from Los Angeles to hold more passengers on busier routes. These buses are retired.

See also
Transportation in Indianapolis
List of bus transit systems in the United States
List of bus rapid transit systems in the Americas

References

External links 

 
 Indy Connect: Marion County Transit Plan

Intermodal transportation authorities in Indiana
Bus transportation in Indiana
Government of Indianapolis
Transportation in Indianapolis
Transportation in Marion County, Indiana